Azara microphylla, the boxleaf azara, is a species of flowering plant in the willow family Salicaceae, native to Chile and Argentina. It has small, shiny, very dark green leaves and tiny, vanilla-scented flowers in winter. It also tolerates full shade.

The specific epithet microphylla comes from the Greek micro ("small") and phyllos ("leaf").

This plant has gained the Royal Horticultural Society's Award of Garden Merit.

References

Salicaceae
Plants described in 1845
Taxa named by Joseph Dalton Hooker